Russell Braun  (born 19 July 1965) is a Canadian operatic lyric baritone and Juno Award winner.

Much sought-after as a soloist and for opera roles, Russell Braun performs regularly at the Metropolitan Opera, the Salzburg Festival, the Lyric Opera of Chicago, l'Opéra de Paris, the San Diego Opera, the San Francisco Opera and the Canadian Opera Company in Toronto.

Braun is a graduate of the Faculty of Music at the University of Toronto, and lives in Toronto.

He is the son of famous Canadian baritone Victor Braun. He is married to pianist Carolyn Maule, with whom he performs regularly.

In 2016, he was appointed as an Officer of the Order of Canada.

References

External links 
 

Canadian operatic baritones
University of Toronto alumni
1965 births
Living people
Dora Mavor Moore Award winners
Officers of the Order of Canada
Musicians from Toronto
Juno Award for Classical Album of the Year – Vocal or Choral Performance winners
20th-century Canadian male opera singers
21st-century Canadian male opera singers